Gambone Peak is a peak,  high, located  southwest of Coronet Peak, at the junction of Leap Year Glacier and Black Glacier, in the Bowers Mountains of Victoria Land, Antarctica. This topographical feature was first mapped by the United States Geological Survey from surveys and U.S. Navy air photos, 1960–64, and was named by the Advisory Committee on Antarctic Names for Lieutenant Joseph C. Gambone, Operations Administrative Assistant on the staff of the Commander, U.S. Naval Support Force, Antarctica, 1967 and 1968. The peak lies situated on the Pennell Coast, a portion of Antarctica lying between Cape Williams and Cape Adare.

References

Mountains of Victoria Land
Pennell Coast